The Plattling Black Hawks are an American football team from Plattling, Germany. The club was, until 2004, known as the Deggendorf Black Hawks.

The club's greatest success was earning a promotion to the German Football League in 2008 and qualifying for play-offs for the first time in 2010.

History
The Black Hawks entered league football in 1987, when they joined the southern division of the Regionalliga Bayern. The following 19 seasons, the club remained in local Bavarian and Southern German leagues, becoming a fixture in the tier-three Regionalliga Süd from 2001 onwards.

In 2004, the Deggendorf Black Hawks moved nine kilometres southwest, becoming the Plattling Black Hawks instead.

Under the new name, the club quickly experienced unprecedented success, winning its league and defeating the Obertshausen Blizzards to earn a promotion to the southern division of the 2nd Bundesliga. Plattling spent the next three seasons at this level, successfully competing with the top teams and eventually winning the league in 2008. The team defeated the Darmstadt Diamonds in the following two promotion games and earned a spot in the German Football League (GFL) for 2009.

In the GFL in 2009, the Black Hawks managed to finish in fifth place, one above the relegation rank and Bavarian rival, the Munich Cowboys. The following season saw the team come third despite a losing record and qualifying for the play-offs. In the quarter finals, the Berlin Adler were, however, too strong and the club was knocked out courtesy to a 3–17 defeat.

Plattling was unable to fulfil all its fixtures in the 2011 season, suffering from a large number of injuries, losing all games except for the last three, which it cancelled. The club decided on 1 September 2011 not to apply for a GFL2 licence for the following season but instead to compete in the third tier Regionalliga.

In the Regionalliga the club's troubles continued in 2012, finishing last and losing all ten season games, dropping down another level, now to the Bayernliga. The 2013 season saw the club recover and win seven out of eight regular season games but then lose 2–0 to Königsbrunn Ants in the Bayernliga play-offs. In the 2014 season the club did not win a game in its Bayernliga division and finished last. It came last once more in 2015 but this time recorded one win and seven losses.

Honours
 GFL
 Play-off qualification : 2010
 League membership : (3) 2009–2011
 GFL 2
 Southern Division champions: 2008

Recent seasons
Recent seasons of the club:

 RR = Relegation round
 PR = Promotion round
 QF = Quarter finals
 SF = Semi finals
 GB = German Bowl
 Final three games of the 2011 season not played.

References

External links
  Official website
  German Football League official website
  Football History Historic American football tables from Germany

American football teams in Germany
German Football League teams
American football teams established in 1986
American football in Bavaria
1986 establishments in West Germany
Deggendorf (district)